Winston Jenkins (1912 – 10 May 1982) was a South African cricketer. He played in two first-class matches for Border in 1929/30.

See also
 List of Border representative cricketers

References

External links
 

1912 births
1982 deaths
South African cricketers
Border cricketers
Cricketers from Pembroke, Pembrokeshire
British emigrants to South Africa